Sande (also known as Sande i Sunnfjord) is a village in Sunnfjord Municipality in Vestland county, Norway. Sande Church is located in this village, serving the people of the central part of the municipality.

The European route E39 highway runs through the village of Sande, connecting it to the village of Vadheim to the south and the town of Førde to the north.

The village was the administrative centre of the old Gaular Municipality until its dissolution in 2020.

Notable residents
Wenche Nistad (born 1952) – businessperson and civil servant

References

Villages in Vestland
Sunnfjord